Christopher Antwi-Adjei (born 7 February 1994) is a professional footballer who plays as a midfielder for Bundesliga club VfL Bochum. Born in Germany, Antwi-Adjei has represented the Ghana national team.

Club career
In May 2021, VfL Bochum, newly promoted to the Bundesliga, announced the signing of Antwi-Adjei for the 2021–22 season. He signed a contract until 2024 and joined on a free transfer from SC Paderborn.

International career
Antwi-Adjei made his debut for Ghana national team on 18 November 2019 in an AFCON qualifier against São Tomé and Príncipe.

Career statistics

References

External links
 

1994 births
Living people
Sportspeople from Hagen
Citizens of Ghana through descent
Ghanaian footballers
Ghana international footballers
German footballers
German sportspeople of Ghanaian descent
Association football midfielders
SC Westfalia Herne players
TSG Sprockhövel players
SC Paderborn 07 players
VfL Bochum players
Oberliga (football) players
Regionalliga players
3. Liga players
2. Bundesliga players
Bundesliga players
Footballers from North Rhine-Westphalia